Kenneth Stanley (1922–2013) was a male English international table tennis player.

Table tennis career
He won a bronze medal at the 1939 World Table Tennis Championships in the Swaythling Cup (men's team event) with Ken Hyde, Hyman Lurie, Ernest Bubley and Arthur Wilmott.

He played table tennis in India and won the All India Cup winning the Men's Singles, Men's Doubles and Mixed Doubles and later coached in Scotland, New Zealand, Norway and England and had an academy in Burnley.

Personal life
He was a football agent and ran a sports agency in London and was also an instructor for the RAF during the war. He married Marion Brook in 1942 and had four children. His son David and daughter Janet played table tennis and won national youth titles. He died in 2013.

See also
 List of England players at the World Team Table Tennis Championships
 List of World Table Tennis Championships medalists

References

English male table tennis players
1922 births
2013 deaths
World Table Tennis Championships medalists